State Road 89 (NM 89) is a state highway in the US state of New Mexico. NM 89's southern terminus is north of Melrose at NM 268, and the northern terminus is at NM 252 in House.

Major intersections

See also

References

089
Transportation in Curry County, New Mexico
Transportation in Quay County, New Mexico
Transportation in Roosevelt County, New Mexico